Covel is a census-designated place (CDP) in Wyoming County, West Virginia, United States. As of the 2010 census, its population is 142.

References

Census-designated places in West Virginia
Census-designated places in Wyoming County, West Virginia
Coal towns in West Virginia